NGC 1023 is a barred lenticular galaxy, a member of the NGC 1023 group of galaxies in the Local Supercluster. Distance measurements vary from 9.3 to 19.7 million parsecs (30 to 64 million light-years). The black hole was discovered by analyzing the dynamics of the galaxy.

NGC 1023 is included in Halton Arp's Atlas of Peculiar Galaxies, under the category "Galaxies with Nearby Fragments" under the number 135.

NGC 1023 has been estimated to have about 490 globular clusters, consistent with similar early-type galaxies. A number of small galaxies have been found around NGC 1023, the collection of which is labelled the "NGC 1023 Group." NGC 1023 has a satellite galaxy named NGC 1023A, which is a Magellanic spiral galaxy; its globular cluster system is much smaller, estimated to be around six individuals.

References

External links
 

1023
2154
10123
135
NGC 1023 Group
Perseus (constellation)
Barred lenticular galaxies